Michel Bozon (c.1949 – 23 January 1970), was a World Cup alpine ski racer from France.

Bozon, age 20, was killed on the Piste Emile Allais at Megève during a World Cup downhill event.

After his death, changes were made to improve safety, but the course was taken off the World Cup circuit after February 1975.

He was a cousin of Charles Bozon, the French alpine skier  who died tragically in an avalanche in 1964.

References

French male alpine skiers
Skiing deaths
1970 deaths
Year of birth uncertain
Sport deaths in France
20th-century French people